Series 5 of La France a un incroyable talent aired from 3 November to 22 December 2010.

Final

References 

France
2010 French television seasons